The Minneapolis Forum Cafeteria was located at 36 South 7th Street  originally constructed in 1914 as the Saxe Theater, later the Strand Theater.  A 1930 reconstruction created a cafeteria with a stunning Art Deco interior of black onyx and pale green tiles, sconces, chandeliers, and mirrors with a Minnesota-themed motif: pine cones, waterfalls, and Viking ships.

The cafeteria did not outlive the era of fast food and closed its doors in August 1975. Threatened with redevelopment, the building was placed on the National Register of Historic Places on March 16, 1976. Three months later the old Forum opened as Scottie's on Seventh, a disco nightclub that retained the Art Deco style of the Forum. When the venue was again threatened with demolition to make way for the Minneapolis City Center project, preservationists brought suit; the developers were ordered to disassemble the 3500 pieces of glass and reassemble the Art Deco interior within a new space in City Center. 

Thus relocated to 18 South 7th Street, Scottie's on Seventh reopened in 1983 but closed in 1985. It got delisted from NRHP in 1987. Several restaurants have since occupied the space since then: the Paramount Cafe, Mick's, Goodfellow's from 1996 to 2005, The Forum, and most recently Il Foro which opened in June 2015 and closed in May 2016. In 2018 a brand-new restaurant, Fhima's, opened in this space with a French-Moroccan influenced menu.

References

External links 
The Forum Cafeteria at the MHS
Downtown: long gone

Buildings and structures in Minneapolis
Commercial buildings completed in 1914
National Register of Historic Places in Minneapolis
Commercial buildings on the National Register of Historic Places in Minnesota
Art Deco architecture in Minnesota
Former National Register of Historic Places in Minnesota